Dire Dawa City Sport Club (Amharic: ድሬዳዋ ከተማ ስፖርት ክለብ), also known as Dire Dawa Kenema, is a professional Ethiopian football club based in Dire Dawa. They play in the top division of Ethiopian football, the Ethiopian Premier League.

History

Foundation (1982-2003) 
Dire Dawa Kenema was originally founded in 1982 (1975 E.C.) until the club went defunct.

New Beginning (2003-Present) 
The club was reestablished in 2003 (1996 EC) with the hopes of restoring Dire Dawa's historic place in Ethiopian football. The following year (2004–05) the club played in a regional league (then considered the third tier of Ethiopian football). In 2005–06 the club entered the second tier of Ethiopian football called the Ethiopian National League (now called the Ethiopian Higher League). The club entered the Ethiopian Premier League for the first time in 2007–08 season.

Dire Dawa Kenema spent the first few season in the top division battling relegation. The club lost its best player from the 2009–10 season, Ashenafi Girma, to Meta Abo Beer F.C. during the 2010–11 season. Dire Dawa Kenema was relegated from the Premier League after the 2011-12 season.

Dire Dawa Kenema was promoted back to the Ethiopian Premier League after the 2014–15 season and managed to finish 11th in the 2015–16 season avoiding relegation. The club battled relegation in the two seasons since then and avoided relegation each time. The club signed Yosef Dengeto to a contract in March 2018. Former coach of the Ethiopian National team Yohannes Sahle signed on to coach the club on August 3, 2018. 

Fisseha Teumelisan was sacked as manager of the club on February 12, 2021. After his firing, Fisseha sued the club saying that he hadn't been paid the amount that was owned to him after the termination of his contract.

Stadiums 
The club plays in home matches at the Dire Dawa Stadium.

Departments 
Dire Dawa Sport Club Academy consists of the U20 team. Players from the U20 team are often picked to fill a few roster spots at the senior level from time to time. Dire Dawa Women's Football Club plays in the first division of the Ethiopian Women's Premier League.

Active Departments 

 Boxing Team
 Women's Football team
 Football team (U-20)

Players

First-team squad
As of 8 January 2021

Club Officials 

President: Abdulselam Mohammed

Vice President: Sultan Ali

General Manager: Fitsum Kinfishe

Coaching and Medical staff 
As of 12 March 2021

Team Leader:  Tofek Hassien 

Manager/Head Coach:  Zemariam Woldegiorgis 

First assistant coach:  Tofek Edris 

Second assistant coach:  Ephrem Getahun 

First-team goalkeeper coach:  Abaye Befekadu 

Team Doctor:  Asrat Legesse

Former players 
  Simon Abay

Former coaches 
  Yohannes Sahle (2018) 
 Fisseha Teumelisan (2017-2021) - as assistant & head coach

  Fisseha Teumelisan

References

External links
 Official Website

 
Football clubs in Ethiopia